The retroflex ejective is a rare consonantal sound, used in some spoken languages.

Features
Features of the retroflex ejective:

Occurrence

See also
 Index of phonetics articles

External links
 

Retroflex consonants
Ejectives
Oral consonants
Central consonants